The Kirov Islands or Sergey Kirov Islands (Ostrova Kirova or  Aрхипелаг Сергея Кирова, Archipelag Sergeya Kirova) is an island group in the Kara Sea, Russian Federation.

Geography
This archipelago, as well as Kirov Island, its northernmost island which is located at the northeastern end somewhat detached from the main island cluster, is named after Joseph Stalin's politburo member Sergey Kirov. All islands are quite flat, mostly with sandy spits and coastal lagoons in their shores.

The group's largest island is Isachenko, named after Boris Lavrent'evich Isachenko Russian microbiologist and botanist of the Academy of Sciences of the USSR. There is an experiment station (Polyarnaya Stantsiya) on Isachenko Island.

The sea surrounding the Kirov Islands is covered with pack ice with some polynias in the winter and there are many ice floes even in the summer. The strait between Isachenko and Slozhnyy Island is known as Proliv Aeros"yëmki.

This island group belongs to the Krasnoyarsk Krai administrative division of the Russian Federation. They are also part of the Great Arctic State Nature Reserve, the largest nature reserve of the Russian Federation.

The Kirov Archipelago is not to be confused with Kirovskiye Ostrova, a historic district of Saint Petersburg formed by a group of three coastal islands in the Gulf of Finland north of the Neva river delta.

See also
List of islands of Russia

References

Archipelagoes of the Kara Sea
Populated places of Arctic Russia
Islands of Krasnoyarsk Krai